Jakkanna is a 2016 Indian Telugu-language comedy film directed by Vamsi Krishna Akella. The film features Sunil and Mannara Chopra in the lead roles, with Kabir Duhan Singh and Saptagiri playing supporting roles. Jakkanna released on 29 July 2016. The film was later dubbed in Hindi.

Plot 
A man's (Sunil) attempts to repay a kindness earns him the wrath of a ruthless gangster.

Cast 
 Sunil as Ganesh alias Jakkanna
 Mannara Chopra as Sahasra
 Kabir Duhan Singh as Uppalapati Bhairaju
 Prudhvi as Katakatala Kattappa
 Saptagiri as Kung Fu Instructor
 Chitram Seenu as Seenu
 Harsha Chemudu as Kung Fu Student
 Raghu Karumanchi as Bairangi Manishi
 Satya Prakash as Auto driver
 Satya as Satya Prakash
Junior Relangi as Police officer
Raja Ravindra
Nagineedu
Ashish Vidyarthi

Soundtrack

Reception 
A critic from The Times of India wrote that "If you can forget logic for a couple of hours and just let the film humour you, Jakkana can keep you entertained".

References

External links

2016 films
2010s Telugu-language films